Bill Swallow is a classic motorcycle rider from Yorkshire.

Racing
He has won the Manx Grand Prix 9 times, a feat only bettered by Bob Heath.  He has averaged 110 mph on the course and has been interviewed by Murray Walker about his successes.

He retired from racing in 2003, but later returned. He came 4th in the 2011 350 cc Junior Classic Race on the mountain course.

Personal life
Outside of racing, Bill was a teacher at Holmfirth High School, West Yorkshire.

References

External links
 Isle of Man TT database

English motorcycle racers
Living people
Year of birth missing (living people)